The Championship Gaming Series was an international esports league based in the United States, with teams from several other countries. The CGS was preceded by the 2006 Championship Gaming Invitational, a television pilot featuring several future CGS players. The league was founded in 2007 and was owned and operated by DirecTV in association with British Sky Broadcasting (BSkyB) and STAR TV. It folded in 2008 after two seasons.

League history

Origins
Although professional video game contests had been going on for several years, organizers recognized the need for it to gain greater exposure, preferably through regular telecasts. The World Series of Gaming was shown on MTV in a 30-minute special in 2005, but there were complaints about the quality of the production.

Meanwhile, the World Series of Poker had become a popular program on ESPN and had turned no-limit Texas hold 'em poker into a spectator sport. Influenced by its success, David Hill, an executive at Fox Sports and DirecTV (and himself an avid video gamer) pitched the idea of a TV program based on video gaming. Craig "Torbull" Levine, manager of Team 3D played a key role in negotiations.

In the summer of 2006, a pilot episode revolving around the Championship Gaming Invitational was taped at Treasure Island in San Francisco, California. It featured a Counter-Strike 1.6 match in which Team CompLexity beat Team3D. It also introduced the Dead or Alive pro players such as Emmanuel "Master" Rodriguez who later went on to star for the league as pro gamers. This was also the only time that Battlefield 2 was featured in the CGS franchise, as the world champions Code7 took on three American teams. The first Invitational was said to produce a 400% plus increase in ratings for DirecTV's 101 channel at the time. The first pilot was then followed up by 2nd CGI2 Invitational event in Los Angeles which also introduced first female Dead or Alive player Vanessa Arteaga. After the ratings showed some more promise, a full season with a league structure greenlit for 2007.

CGS Pro-Am
The CGS Pro-Am Division was a players opportunity to play against the Pros and compete for more than $40,000 in cash prizes. The first season included Counter-Strike 1.6, Counter-Strike: Source, and Team Fortress 2 tournaments. Shortly after the first season was completed The CGS franchise was cut by DirecTV which ultimately ended this opportunity for another competitive league for the everyday gamer.

2007 season
The first CGS season consisted of six franchises from six different major cities throughout Region 1 (the U.S. and Canada) plus a total of ten more franchises from the other Global Regions around the world. Each franchise consisted of a total of ten players: five Counter-Strike: Source players, two Dead or Alive 4 players (one male and one female), one FIFA 07 player, and two Project Gotham Racing 3 players. CGS held their first ever draft at the Playboy Mansion in Los Angeles with Vanessa Arteaga being selected as the first overall pick.

The first televised match was shown on DirecTV-exclusive channel, The 101, on July 9, 2007. The Region 1 Grand Finals were held on July 30, 2007, in Los Angeles. The Chicago Chimera defeated the Carolina Core by 22 points to 21, to become the first CGS Regional Champions. In the World Finals in December, the Chimera defeated the Core again to become World Champions and win the $500,000 top prize.

The above-mentioned Team 3D and Team CompLexity of the pilot were later expanded to two of the league's other teams, the New York 3D and the Los Angeles Complexity respectively.

2008 season

In 2008, two new franchises were added: the Kuala Lumpur Taufan and the Dubai Mirage. The franchise player setup remained the same, with the FIFA 07 player switching to FIFA 2008, and the Project Gotham Racing 3 players switching to Forza Motorsport 2. On June 16, 2008, The 101 showed the first televised match of the second CGS season. Andy Reif was replaced as commissioner with Dale Hopkins, the former Chief Operating Officer of G4.

The Region 1 finals saw Carolina Core beat the Dallas Venom by a single point to become the North American Regional Champions.

The World Finals immediately followed the North American season, beginning on July 14. On July 28, 2008, the Birmingham Salvo defeated the San Francisco Optx to become the CGS World Champions for 2008, as well as the first international team to not only make the final, but win it as well.

On November 18, 2008, it was announced on esports portal Cadred.org that the Championship Gaming Series would be ceasing operations immediately, news that was confirmed only hours later on the Championship Gaming Series' official website. The reasons for the departure of CGS remain unclear, but Hill had left DirecTV after it was purchased by Liberty Media and therefore was no longer in charge of any programming on The 101.

Games
Season 1 supported the following games:
 Counter-Strike: Source
 Dead or Alive 4
 FIFA 07
 Project Gotham Racing 3

Season 2 supported the following games:
 Counter-Strike: Source
 Dead or Alive 4
 FIFA 08
 Forza Motorsport 2

General structure
Before the start of the season, the CGS holds scouting combines in various cities around the world. Based on the results of the combines, the general managers then meet and draft players to participate in the league. Combines are open to all comers.

In 2008, leagues could protect players in two of the five events; everyone else is put into the draft pool and can go to any team.

Scoring system
Points are awarded for each event as follows:
DOA 4: One point per each round won, regardless of result; this event is best five of nine rounds
Forza Motorsport 2: Teams are awarded four points for the winning driver, two points for the second-place driver, and one point for third place.
FIFA 08: Gamers participate in an eight-minute minigame. Each goal is scored one point for the team competition. If the game is tied, penalty kicks determine the winner, and each goal also counts as a point in the team totals.
Counter-Strike Source: This event consists of 18 rounds. All games count toward the team total, one point per winning round. If the teams tie after 18 rounds, a sudden death round is played. There is also a tie-breaking round if the teams are tied in the overall points.

No bonus points are awarded to any team for winning an event.

Broadcasting
All North American matches and the world tournament took place at the Barker Hangar in Santa Monica, California. Tickets were free and were distributed by Jam Packed Entertainment.

The announcers on the DirecTV telecasts in 2008 were Paul "ReDeYe" Chaloner, Marcus "djWHEAT" Graham, Johnathan "Fatal1ty" Wendel, and Andrew Siciliano. The original host was Stryker, also a disc jockey on KROQ-FM radio in Los Angeles; Stryker left before the 2007 world final.

The 2008 world tournament was seen on G4 in a Saturday-night highlight package, in addition to the live telecasts on DirecTV.

Regions

Franchises and teams

For the first season of the league there was six franchises from six different major cities throughout Region 1 (the U.S. and Canada) plus a total of ten more franchises from the other Global Regions around the world. Each franchise consists of a total of ten players: five Counter-Strike:Source players, two Dead or Alive 4 players (one male and one female), one FIFA 07 player, and two Project Gotham Racing 3 players.

The Region 1 Grand Finals were held on July 30, 2007, in Los Angeles. The Chicago Chimera defeated the Carolina Core 22–21 to become the first CGS Regional Champions. Both Chicago and Carolina competed in the World Finals on December 14, 2007, and Chicago won the World Championship.

Fighting Game Competition

Region 1

Region 2

Region 3

Region 4

Region 5

Region 6

See also
2007 Region 1 CGS Draft

References

 
Sports leagues in the United States
DirecTV
2007 establishments in the United States
2008 disestablishments in the United States
Former News Corporation subsidiaries
Former Liberty Media subsidiaries
Audience (TV network) original programming